Antonella Moro Bundu (born 4 December 1969 in Florence) is an Italian activist. In 2019 she was a candidate to be Mayor of Florence, making her the first black woman to run for mayor of a major Italian city.

At present, she is city council member, leading the left opposition "Sinistra Progetto Comune" group.

Life
Antonella Bundu was born in Florence in 1969, the daughter of a Florentine mother and a Sierra Leonean father. In the late 1980s she studied in Liverpool, which she recalls as a "politically charged city" after the Toxteth riots: "I was studying black history in the city's libraries, and participated actively in the neightbourhood's protests."

An ex-DJ and activist for Oxfam, Bundu was one of the first on the scene at the 2018 Florence shooting of the Senegalese immigrant Idy Diene. She took part in the anti-racist protests which followed his death, and after making a speech at the Alfieri Theatre was invited to run for mayor on behalf of a radical-left coalition including Power to the People and the Communist Refoundation Party. In the 2019 Mayoral election, she received 14,016 votes (7.29%).

References

1969 births
Living people
Italian women's rights activists
Politicians from Florence
Italian politicians
Italian people of Sierra Leonean descent